This is a list of television programmes broadcast by British television channel ITV2.

Current programming

Original programming

Programming from other ITV channels

Adult animation

Acquired programming
{{columns-list|colwidth=30em|
The Masked Singer US (2021–present)
Crossing Swords (2020–present)
The O.C. (2022–present)
One Tree Hill (2022–present)
All American (2022–present)
The Sex Lives of College Girls (2022–present)
Chuck (2022-present)
Hart of Dixie (2022–present)
Veronica Mars (2022–present) (seasons 1–3 only, season 4 is on Lionsgate+)
Ellen's Game of Games (2018–present)
Australian Ninja Warrior (2021–present)
Hell's Kitchen USA
Roswell, New Mexico (2020-present)
Santa Inc. (2021)Superstore (2018–present)Two and a Half Men (Seasons 9-12 only) (2014–present)
}}

Upcoming programming
 Big Brother (2023)
 Tell Me Everything (unknown)

Former programming(+) indicates an ITV2 original commission''

Notes

References

See also
 ITV (TV network)
 ITV2
 List of television programmes broadcast by ITV
 List of programmes broadcast by CITV

ITV2
Television programmes
ITV2